David Miguel Costa Rodrigues (born 10 July 1991) is a Portuguese cyclist, who last rode for UCI Continental team .

Major results

2012
 1st Stage 1 Volta a Portugal do Futuro
2013
 2nd Overall Volta a Portugal do Futuro
2014
 1st  Young rider classification, Volta a Portugal
2016
 9th Overall Vuelta Asturias
2017
 1st Grand Prix de Mortágua
2018
 1st Stage 5 
2019
 6th Overall Vuelta Asturias
 6th Overall GP Beiras e Serra da Estrela
 7th Overall Volta a Portugal
 7th Overall Troféu Joaquim Agostinho

References

External links
 

1991 births
Living people
Portuguese male cyclists
People from Guarda, Portugal
Sportspeople from Guarda District